Gremillion is a surname. Notable people with the surname include:

Jean Gremillion (1901–1959), French film director
John Gremillion (born 1967), American voice actor
Kristen Gremillion (born 1958), American anthropologist

See also
Grillon